Manhunter is the name given to several different fictional characters appearing in comic books published by DC Comics. They are depicted as superheroes and antiheroes.

Paul Kirk, Rick Nelson, Paul Kirk

"Paul Kirk, Manhunter" was a crime series that ran in Adventure Comics #58–72 (Jan. 1941 – March 1942). In this original incarnation, Kirk was a non-costumed investigator who helped police solve crimes. The word "manhunter" in the title was merley an epithet describing Kirk's role and was not a name, nickname, or alias used by Kirk in the stories. However, Paul Kirk was re-imagined as a kind of superhero called Manhunter in the 1970s, so he retroactively became comics' first Manhunter despite not possessing the name before the Quality or Simon & Kirby characters (below).

The final issue of Adventure Comics to feature a "Paul Kirk, Manhunter" story was #72. The following issue replaced it with a new Manhunter, by Joe Simon and Jack Kirby. This was Rick Nelson, a former big game hunter turned superhero. After a few issues, the name Rick Nelson was replaced by the name Paul Kirk, despite being a totally different character. The Simon/Kirby team left the feature after #80 (November 1942), though this Manhunter appeared in Adventure Comics until #92 in June 1944. This version of Manhunter (published by DC) appeared concurrently with the Quality character below.

Dan Richards
The second Manhunter's first appearance was in the Quality Comics title Police Comics #8 (cover-date (March 1942) and his solo stories ended in issue #101 (August 1950). The Quality Comics characters were purchased by DC Comics when Quality went out of business in 1956. Dan Richards would eventually be featured in Young All-Stars and All-Star Squadron. His origin was retold in Secret Origins (vol. 2) #22 (January 1988).

Donald "Dan" Richards attended the police academy with his girlfriend's brother, Jim, who was at the top of the class, while Dan was at the very bottom. After Jim was framed for a crime he didn't commit, Dan took up the identity of Manhunter to track down the actual killer. He caught the perpetrator and cleared Jim's name. Afterwards, he continued to operate as Manhunter. His sidekick was a dog named Thor, who was later retconned to be a robotic sentry operating under the auspices of the Manhunter cult. 

According to Jess Nevins' Encyclopedia of Golden Age Superheroes, Manhunter's enemies include "ordinary criminals, Germans, the Nazi agent the Cobra, Dr. Sims (who has created telepathic brains-in-a-jar), the Ghostmaster, the whip-wielding female crime boss Red Kate, and the Spine-Snapper and his trained ape".

Dan's granddaughter, Marcie Cooper, became the third Harlequin after he convinced her to join the Manhunters.

Dan Richards was later killed by Mark Shaw, who had fallen back into his Dumas persona.

Mark Shaw

Clone of Paul Kirk
One of Paul Kirk's remaining clones, claiming the identity of Manhunter and wearing Paul Kirk's Council-created uniform, masterminded the creation of the Secret Society of Super Villains. He died trying to kill Darkseid.

Chase Lawler
A new Manhunter title (by Steven Grant and Vince Giarrano), unrelated to any of the previous Manhunters, was created in the aftermath of the miniseries Zero Hour: Crisis in Time! #4-0 in 1994. Chase Lawler was a musician who summoned the Wild Huntsman to save himself and his girlfriend from harm. He did not understand the commitment he was making to the Wild Huntsman and found himself compelled to hunt the lonely. He tried to resist the urge by hunting villains, with limited success.

Lawler suffered a heart attack and Mark Shaw attempted to resuscitate him. This transferred the bond with the Wild Huntsman and the compulsion to hunt to Shaw. It was later revealed that Lawler had undergone the same mental programming as Shaw and that the Wild Huntsman was actually an illusion created as a side effect. Lawler was drugged and then murdered by Shaw, who had fallen back into his Dumas persona.

Kirk DePaul
Created by Kurt Busiek and Tom Grummett, the Kirk DePaul version of Manhunter was the last surviving Council-created clone of Paul Kirk and wore a variation of that Manhunter uniform. DePaul was roaming through Africa when his progenitor was killed. DePaul was a partner in the superhero-for-hire firm known as the Power Company. Fellow partner in the firm Skyrocket despised him for his miserly, materialistic attitude.

DePaul's role in the Power Company attracted the attention of Asano Nitobe and Christine St. Clair, who confronted him. They established that he was not evil and, although St. Clair continued watching DePaul, decided not to kill him. DePaul was later murdered and decapitated by Mark Shaw who had suffered a breakdown and resumed his Dumas persona.

Although never officially confirmed, it is strongly implied that DePaul was later resurrected by Morgaine le Fey as the character "Swashbuckler" in the comic book Trinity (2008–2009), a mercenary who shows all the skills of a Manhunter. Trinity writer Kurt Busiek (also the creator of Power Company and Kirk DePaul) confirmed that Swashbuckler is the only member of the Trinity series' villainous Dreambound that has been seen before in the DC Universe: "Swashbuckler is a pre-existing character, but not a Silver Age one. There are clues in the story that indicate who he is, though..." Also, in Trinity #27, Swashbuckler reveals a scar visible all around his neck. At the end of the Trinity series, the Dreambound including Swashbuckler switch to the side of the heroes, and are later pardoned in court. Their current whereabouts are unknown.

Kate Spencer

Kate Spencer, like Mark Shaw, is a lawyer, but instead works as a prosecutor. Outraged by the ability of supercriminals to escape justice, Spencer assembled a costume from a variety of devices left over from various heroes and villains. A Darkstar costume and Azrael's Batman gloves give Spencer enhanced strength, agility and resistance to injury while Mark Shaw's power staff allows her to fire bolts of energy. Spencer has taken on several minor league supervillains including Copperhead and the Shadow Thief.

Recently Spencer fought her father, a minor league supervillain who erroneously claimed to be the son of Al Pratt – the Golden Age Atom. Kate is in fact the granddaughter of Phantom Lady and Iron Munro. Al Pratt allowed Sandra Knight (the Phantom Lady) to use his contact information in order to enter a home for unwed mothers, which led to the mix-up.

Most recently Kate Spencer, in her heroic identity as Manhunter, began working with the US government's Department of Extranormal Operations, headed by the former criminal Mister Bones. The new Manhunter series in which she appears began in 2004. This current series has featured appearances by Dan Richards, Mark Shaw, Chase Lawler, and Kirk DePaul.

Manhunter was initially slated to be cancelled due to low sales, but a massive and organized fan campaign, along with support from DC Comics' management, allowed for another five-issue arc to be commissioned. The series was given a second reprieve from cancellation. It was meant to be restarted in July 2007, but has been put on hold until several issues have been written and drawn before the title resumed publication. The series returned in June 2008 with issue #31, written by co-creator Marc Andreyko and pencilled by Michael Gaydos and ended again in January 2009 with issue #38.

Kate Spencer eventually joined the Birds of Prey, and her teammates were subsequently featured in a number of issues of the Manhunter series.

Kate Spencer briefly relocated to Gotham City where she took up a position as the new District Attorney. Her first adventures in Gotham were chronicled in a back-up feature in Batman: Streets of Gotham. She later appeared in Justice Society of America, which saw Kate move to the city of Monument Point and join the JSA.

Ramsey Robinson
Ramsey Robinson is the son of Kate Spencer and her ex-husband, Peter Robinson. He is revealed to have super powers in Manhunter (vol. 3) #33 when the seven-year-old smashed a garbage truck while rescuing his dog. Issue #38, penned as a "future story", details Ramsey's college graduation and introduces his super-powered boyfriend, Justin, as well as Jade, the super-powered daughter of Obsidian (who is named after Obsidian's twin sister, Jade). The story describes Ramsey, Justin, and Jade training to become the next generation of superheroes and ends with an older Kate presenting Ramsey with a man-made replica of her Darkstar exo-mantle as a graduation gift, hinting he's destined to be the next Manhunter.

Manhunter 2070

Starker, a bounty hunter in the future, was the star of Manhunter 2070. The Manhunter 2070 series was created by writer and artist Mike Sekowsky. Starker first appeared in the pages of Showcase #91–93 (June–September 1970).

In 2053, Starker's father was murdered by space pirates and young Starker was taken as a galley slave. Starker took control of the pirate vessel, captured the pirates, and collected a bounty on them. Starker then decided to become a bounty hunter. He was aided by a robot named Arky.

Manhunter 2070 is one of six DC heroes featured in Walter Simonson's 2012 graphic novel The Judas Coin.

Other versions
 A version of the Starker Manhunter appears in the Twilight mini-series by Howard Chaykin and José Luis García-López in 1990. In the series Starker is given the first name of John, and it is stated that he is the older brother of Silver Age hero Star Hawkins. He dies in Twilight #3.
 In the Tangent Comics print, a character named Manhunter is a member of the Secret Six. This Manhunter is female, wears a gold, red and blue-black costume, and has a robotic dog named "Pooch". She is killed by the Tangent version of Power Girl in Tangent: Superman's Reign #4. Lori Lemaris takes on the identity in Tangent: Superman's Reign #7.

In other media

Television
 The Paul Kirk version of Manhunter appears in the Beware the Batman episode "Unique", voiced by Xander Berkeley. 
 Both Kate Spencer and Mark Shaw appear in the "Arrowverse":
 Chelah Horsdal portrays Kate Spencer on The CW series Arrow. 
 David Cubitt portrays Mark Shaw on Arrow.

References

External links
Manhunter I (Richards) Index
Manhunter II (Kirk) Index
Manhunter I (Richards) Profile
 Comics Nexus – Near Mint Memories: Manhunter (Jan. '05)
Power Company Chronology at DC Cosmic Teams
The Manhunter 20K Challenge: Help ensure the continued publication of Manhunter
Everything Manhunter part 2
Grand Comics Database Project – Index of Manhunter vol. 1
Grand Comics Database Project – Index of Manhunter vol. 2
Grand Comics Database Project – Index of Manhunter vol. 3

Characters created by Jack Kirby
Characters created by Mike Sekowsky
Clone characters in comics
Comics by Archie Goodwin (comics)
Comics by Walt Simonson
Comics characters introduced in 1941
Comics characters introduced in 1942
Comics characters introduced in 1970
Comics characters introduced in 1975
Comics characters introduced in 1976
Comics characters introduced in 1994
Comics characters introduced in 2002
DC Comics characters with accelerated healing
DC Comics martial artists
DC Comics titles
Fiction set in the 2070s